The Seniors Open of Portugal was a men's professional golf tournament on the European Senior Tour. It was played in 2005 and 2006 and then again in 2011. The first prize was €45,000 out of total prize-money of €300,000.

The 2005 event was held at Quinta de Cima, east of Tavira, on the Algarve, the 2006 event was held at Quinta da Marinha Golf Club, west of Cascais, while the 2011 event was held at Belas Clube de Campo Golf Course, north-west of Lisbon.

Winners

External links
Coverage on the European Senior Tour's official site

Former European Senior Tour events
Golf tournaments in Portugal
Recurring sporting events established in 2006
Recurring sporting events disestablished in 2011
Defunct sports competitions in Portugal